Lakhiganj Higher Secondary (Model) School, a school in Dhubri district, Assam, India, is situated in between the Chokapara village and Lakhiganj bazaar.  The school was established in 1952 to impart secondary education in Assamese medium to the children of the rural and economically backward of then Goalpara district.

History 
The school was established in 1952 as a high school at the initiative of local social workers and well wishers, namely, Fulku Sheikh, Kashem Ali, Guru Charan Nath and Sofiur Rohman.  The school got state government provincialization and financial aid on 1 October 1977.  On 28 October 1996, the school was upgraded to a higher secondary school with the introduction of 11th and 12th classes of science stream of Indian education system. 

In 2003, the school got model school status along with special financial assistance from state government due to excellent performance. The school has introduced arts stream for 11th and 12th classes from 2008 academic session.

In addition to the existing education system Government of Assam introduces Vocational Education in this school from the Academic Session 2015–2016. There are two (2) trades, namely- Retail Management and Information Technology/Information Technology enabled Services. Students from class IX to XII can opt this trades as one of their subjects in their courses.

Staff and faculties 

The staff strength of the school is 37 including 30 teaching staff.

Management 
The school is managed by the principal and vice principal/senior teachers. There is a governing council which supervises some administrative affairs and developmental aspects of the school. The working hours of the school are from 10:30 am to 4 pm.

Education 
The school imparts education from 6th standard to 12th standard of the Indian education system (10 + 2), leading to certificates (HSLC, HSSLC).

Library and laboratory 
The library possesses all necessary books for all students and manages the computer facility. The school possesses a science laboratory in the campus for 11 and 12th classes. The laboratory was donated by the Red Horn Division of the Indian Army.

Other activities 
The school is used as a centre for competitive examinations and a polling centre for state legislative assembly and parliamentary elections.

Visitors 
Former Chief minister of Assam, Sarat Chandra Sinha, visited the school on several occasions.

References 

High schools and secondary schools in Assam
1952 establishments in Assam
Educational institutions established in 1952
Dhubri district